Antony Daniel Costa (born 23 June 1981) is an English singer and songwriter. He is best known as a member of the boy band Blue.

Early life
Costa was born in Edgware, North London, Costa attended Hendon School in nearby Barnet. He is half-Greek, half-Jewish. He attended the American Academy school in Larnaca before moving back to England. He has a sister Natalie and a brother Louis who appeared on The X Factor on 3 September 2011 and who was also in a group called The Chase  with former S Club 8 member Jay Asforis.

Career
One of Costa's earliest television roles was as a pupil in Steven Moffat's sitcom Chalk. He then went on to appear in the BBC children's drama Grange Hill.

2000–2005: Career with Blue
In early 2000, Costa and Duncan James convinced Lee Ryan and Simon Webbe to form the group Blue. Blue's R&B-influenced pop allowed the group to achieve commercial success in the United Kingdom and many other countries, including Ireland, Portugal, Belgium, Italy, France, Australia and New Zealand. The band released their debut single "All Rise" in May 2001 and it reached number 4 on the UK Singles Chart. Their follow-up single "Too Close" was released in August 2001 peaking at No. 1 on the UK Singles Chart. They went on to achieve a second number one in November with the ballad "If You Come Back". The album All Rise was released in time for Christmas and reached number one, eventually selling in excess of 1.8 million albums in the UK. The final single from the album, "Fly By II", reached number six in March 2002. Their second studio album, One Love was released in October 2002, entering at No. 1 on the UK Albums Chart and selling more than 150,000 copies. Three singles were released from the album: "One Love", which peaked at No. 3, "Sorry Seems to Be the Hardest Word", featuring vocals from Elton John, which peaked at No. 1, and "U Make Me Wanna", which peaked at #4. Their third studio album, Guilty, was released in autumn 2003, entering at No. 1 on the UK Albums Chart and selling 100,000 copies on the week of release. The album spawned four singles, including the title track, "Guilty", which peaked at No. 2, "Signed, Sealed, Delivered, I'm Yours", featuring vocal from Stevie Wonder and Angie Stone, which peaked at No. 11, "Breathe Easy", which peaked at No. 4, and "Bubblin'", which peaked at No. 9.

Following the release of Best of Blue, includes three tracks only previously in Japan: "The Gift", "It's Alright" and "Elements". By the indication of the album booklet, a live version of "Lonely This Christmas" from CD:UK was intended to be track seven on the album, however, was removed from the track listing for unknown reasons. The album was released in July 2005, becoming available in several European countries, as well as Japan, Thailand and China, however, was a commercial failure and failed to chart anywhere. The album was not released in the UK, despite copies being widely available.

2006–2010: Heart Full of Soul, stage and television
Costa was a contestant on the 2005 series of I'm a Celebrity... Get Me Out of Here! and was evicted from the programme on 3 December 2005 after fourteen days. He released his debut solo single called "Do You Ever Think of Me" in February 2006. The single made its debut and peaked at number nineteen on the UK Singles Chart. Costa worked on the song with Songwriter John McLaughlin and performed live with Scottish session musician Paul Boyd. He went on to compete in the 2006 Eurovision: Making Your Mind Up programme to find a competitor to represent the UK in the Eurovision Song Contest 2006, but did not win the honour, with "It's a Beautiful Thing". In June 2006 Costa posed naked for Cosmopolitan magazine's 10 Years of Naked Male Centrefolds, alongside other stars including singer Ronan Keating, actor Danny Dyer, Labour MP Jim Devine, and TV presenter Craig Doyle. Costa's debut album, Heart Full of Soul was released on 3 July 2006 only in Japan by his record label, Globe Records.

From 10 April 2006, Costa played the lead role of Mickey Johnstone in the London production of the long-running musical Blood Brothers, directed and produced by Bill Kenwright; his contract ran to February 2007. From March, Costa toured the UK in the tenth anniversary tour of Boogie Nights. Costa had his first solo UK tour in February and March 2008, performing songs from his debut album. His UK tour had eighteen dates, which started on 16 February 2008 at The Brindley, in Runcorn and finished on 26 March 2008 in Barrow in Furness. He modelled for Giorgio Armani in late 2008. Costa has appeared twice on the BBC pop quiz Never Mind the Buzzcocks in 2006 and 2008 Costa played Jack in the 2009/2010 pantomime, Jack and the Beanstalk, in Ipswich. Costa toured with the production Popstar: The Musical, playing the part of Cal between April and July 2010, at a series of theatres, across the UK. Costa took part in a celebrity version of TV show Total Wipeout which aired on 18 September 2010.

2011–present: Return with Blue
The group represented the United Kingdom at the 2011 Eurovision Song Contest in Düsseldorf, Germany with the song "I Can" coming in 11th place with 100 points. Blue released their fourth studio album, Roulette on 25 January 2013 with "Hurt Lovers" as the lead single. On 21 February 2013, it was confirmed that the group would be joining The Big Reunion in which six groups from the past reform for a one-off gig including Liberty X, Atomic Kitten and 5ive. From May 2013, the group will be touring the UK and Ireland with the other groups in The Big Reunion concert series. On 27 March 2013, the group announced they would embark on their first headlining tour later on in the year, their first tour in nearly ten years. In April 2016, Antony will join the cast of the musical Save The Last Dance For Me, playing the part of Milton, touring the UK until October 2016.

On 30 November 2021 Blue confirmed they would be going on an arena tour to celebrate their 20th anniversary, it was also confirmed that Atomic Kitten would be supporting them on the tour. When interviewed on This Morning the group also confirmed that they were back in the studio recording, a new album is expected to follow along with the tour.

On 11 April 2022 the group announced that their sixth studio album Heart & Soul which would be released on 9 September 2022. On 20 May the group unveiled the track listing for the album on their social media accounts, following with first single "Haven't Found You Yet". On 29 June 2022, the group released the single "Dance with Me", a cover of the 2001 112 single.

Filmography

Discography

Albums

Singles

References

External links

 Antony Costa sings karaoke at Lucky Voice Brighton with Heart competition winner
 The Chase Official
 The Chase YouTube Channel

1981 births
Living people
Blue (English band) members
English people of Greek Cypriot descent
English pop singers
English male singer-songwriters
Singers from London
People from Edgware
English people of Jewish descent
British contemporary R&B singers
I'm a Celebrity...Get Me Out of Here! (British TV series) participants